Niva Ta'auso is a former Samoan-born New Zealand rugby union player. His position was Centre. He notably played for Counties-Manukau in the National Provincial Championship as well as for Connacht in the Pro12.

He last played for the Pukekohe club where he made his 100th appearance in 2015.

Ta'auso debuted for the Chiefs in the Super 14 in 2005 against the Sharks. In three seasons Ta'auso had played 16 matches and scored 25 points. In 2008 he was drafted into the Highlanders squad.

Ta'auso played for Counties-Manukau in the National Provincial Championship. He debuted against Argentina in 2001 and returned there in 2011 after departing Connacht.

New Zealand Representative Teams
New Zealand Divisional XV – 2004
Junior All Blacks – 2006

Connacht
Connacht announced on their official website on 14 July 2008 that they signed Ta'auso for the Celtic League season 2008–09. He remained there until the end of the 2010–2011 season.

References

Living people
New Zealand rugby union players
Connacht Rugby players
Chiefs (rugby union) players
Highlanders (rugby union) players
Counties Manukau rugby union players
New Zealand sportspeople of Samoan descent
Sportspeople from Apia
1980 births
New Zealand expatriate rugby union players
Expatriate rugby union players in Sri Lanka
Expatriate rugby union players in Ireland
New Zealand expatriate sportspeople in Sri Lanka
New Zealand expatriate sportspeople in Ireland
Rugby union centres